The 1986–87 Alabama Crimson Tide men's basketball team represented the University of Alabama in the 1986–87 NCAA Division I men's basketball season. The team's head coach was Wimp Sanderson, who was in his seventh season at Alabama. The team played their home games at Coleman Coliseum in Tuscaloosa, Alabama. They finished the season with a school-record 28 wins at 28–5 and won the Southeastern Conference regular season title with a 16–2 conference record. The 16 wins in conference were also a school record.

The team lost forward Buck Johnson to graduation, but signed freshman forward Keith Askins from Athens High School in Athens, Alabama.

The Tide also won the 1987 SEC men's basketball tournament, beating LSU in the final and earning an automatic bid to the 1987 NCAA Division I men's basketball tournament. They were seeded second in the Southeast Region, their highest ever in the NCAA tournament thus far. The Tide defeated North Carolina A&T and New Orleans before falling to Providence in the Sweet 16. It was the Tide's third straight Sweet 16 appearance. Alabama's participation in the NCAA Tournament was later vacated by the NCAA.

Roster

Schedule and results

|-
!colspan=9 style=| Regular season

|-
!colspan=9 style=| SEC Tournament

|-
!colspan=9 style=| NCAA Tournament

Rankings

Awards and honors
Derrick McKey – SEC Player of the Year

References 

Alabama Crimson Tide men's basketball seasons
Alabama
Alabama